Bernard Dewulf (30 January 1960 – 23 December 2021) was a Belgian poet and journalist. He died in Antwerp on 23 December 2021, at the age of 61.

Publications
Waar de egel gaat (1995)
Bijlichtingen. Kijken naar schilders (2001)
De wijnjaren (2002)
Blauwziek (2006)
Loerhoek (2006)
Naderingen. Kijken & zoeken naar schilders (2007)
De wijdere blik (2008)
Zeedrift (2009)
Kleine dagen (2009)
Trekvogels in de mist (2012)
Verstrooiingen (2012)
Stadsgedichten (2014)
Toewijdingen. Verzamelde beschouwingen (2014)
Late dagen (2016)
Carrousel (2017)
Naar het gras (2018)
Tuimelingen (2020)

References

External links 

1960 births
2021 deaths
Flemish poets
People from Brussels